Svetlana Isakova (born 18 December 1969) is a Latvian freestyle swimmer. She competed in two events at the 1988 Summer Olympics representing the Soviet Union.

References

External links
 

1969 births
Living people
Latvian female freestyle swimmers
Olympic swimmers of the Soviet Union
Swimmers at the 1988 Summer Olympics
Sportspeople from Riga
Soviet female freestyle swimmers